Enzo Gabriel Trinidad (born 19 September 1996) is an Argentine professional footballer who plays as a midfielder for Primera Nacional side CSD Flandria.

Career
Trinidad's senior career started with Banfield in 2014, he made his professional debut on 31 March in a Primera B Nacional match with Patronato. That was his only appearance in the 2013–14 season, which Banfield ended as champions. He scored on his top-flight debut on 16 August in a defeat to Defensa y Justicia, prior to scoring again four games later versus Belgrano. Throughout the three seasons after his debut, Trinidad made twenty appearances for Banfield. In July 2016, Trinidad joined Brown of Primera B Nacional on loan. He returned to Banfield a year later after thirteen matches.

In 2018, Trinidad signed for Tristán Suárez in Primera B Metropolitana. In July 2019, he moved to Atlanta, where he played until the end of 2020. In February 2021, Trinidad joined CSD Flandria.

Career statistics
.

Honours
Banfield
Primera B Nacional: 2013–14

References

External links

1996 births
Living people
Sportspeople from Buenos Aires Province
Argentine footballers
Association football midfielders
Primera Nacional players
Argentine Primera División players
Primera B Metropolitana players
Club Atlético Banfield footballers
Club Atlético Brown footballers
CSyD Tristán Suárez footballers
Club Atlético Atlanta footballers
Flandria footballers